L'Epée is a mountain in the Pennine Alps, situated near Bourg Saint Pierre in Switzerland. It is located on the ridge Les Maisons Blanches in the Grand Combin massif.

External links
 List of mountains above 2000 m in Switzerland with coordinates

Mountains of the Alps
Alpine three-thousanders
Mountains of Valais
Mountains of Switzerland